Jessica Adamson (born 1972 or 1973) is an Australian journalist.

Adamson was formerly a weekend presenter on Seven News Adelaide.

Career
Adamson's first television appearance was in the late 1980s when she appeared with her sister on Nine Network variety program Hey Hey It's Saturday.   Adamson and her sister Amy competed on the show's infamous talent segment Red Faces, where they performed as an act called Ben Sullivan's Sisters, staging a brief routine called "Can't Blow the Candle Out".

Adamson has been a crime reporter for more than a decade but also acts as foreign correspondent at times, covering the Asian tsunami and also the Olympic games in Sydney, Athens and Beijing. Adamason also regularly filled in as a weeknight presenter on Seven News Adelaide.

In December 2014, Adamson was announced as weekend presenter on Seven News Adelaide replacing Graeme Goodings, she  began her new role on 24 January 2015. On 14 October 2019, Adamson commenced an eight-week period of filling in for Jodie Oddy on the Mix 102.3 breakfast show while Oddy was on maternity leave. On 23 June 2020, Adamson left the Seven Network due to budget cuts.

Personal life
Adamson is married to David and they have three children.

References

External links
 

Living people
Year of birth missing (living people)
21st-century Australian journalists
21st-century Australian women writers